Electoral district of Darlington may refer to:

 Electoral district of Darlington (New South Wales)
 Electoral district of Darlington (Queensland)
 Darlington (UK Parliament constituency)